The 1824 United States presidential election in Mississippi took place between October 26 and December 2, 1824, as part of the 1824 United States presidential election. Voters chose three representatives, or electors to the Electoral College, who voted for President and Vice President.

During this election, the Democratic-Republican Party was the only major national party, and four different candidates from this party sought the Presidency. Mississippi voted for Andrew Jackson over John Quincy Adams, William H. Crawford and Henry Clay. Jackson won Mississippi by a margin of 29.97%.

Results

References

Mississippi
1824
1824 Mississippi elections